Joel Bouagnon (born March 28, 1995) is a former American football running back. He played college football at Northern Illinois University, and signed with the Chicago Bears as an undrafted free agent in 2017.

High school and college career
Bouagnon played high school football first at Central High School in Burlington, Illinois and then transferred to Aurora Christian High School in Aurora, Illinois.

Bouagnon committed to Northern Illinois in 2013 and as a true freshman appeared in four games.

By 2015, Bouagnon earned a First-team All-Mac selection as a running back running for 1,285 yards and 18 Touchdowns. Bouagnon's 18 rushing touchdowns were tied for 10th most in the FBS for the 2015 season. Bouagnon also led the MAC league with 108 points scored and finished second in rushing yards along with six 100 yard rushing games for the season.

In 2016 Bouagnon was selected for the Second-team All-MAC as a Running Back with 885 rushing yards and 8 touchdowns.

Professional career

Chicago Bears
Bouagnon signed with the Chicago Bears as an undrafted free agent on May 11, 2017. On August 3, 2017, he was waived/injured by the Bears and placed on injured reserve. He was released on August 9, 2017.

Green Bay Packers
On January 10, 2018, Bouagnon signed a reserve/future contract with the Green Bay Packers. He was waived on September 1, 2018 and was signed to the practice squad the next day. He was released on October 9, 2018.

Detroit Lions
On October 24, 2018, Bouagnon was signed to the Detroit Lions practice squad, but was released three days later.

New York Jets
On December 11, 2018, Bouagnon was signed to the New York Jets practice squad.

Salt Lake Stallions
On January 12, 2019, Bouagnon signed with the Salt Lake Stallions of the Alliance of American Football. The league ceased operations in April 2019.

References

External links
Northern Illinois Huskies bio

1995 births
Living people
Chicago Bears players
Detroit Lions players
Green Bay Packers players
New York Jets players
Northern Illinois Huskies football players
Players of American football from Illinois
Salt Lake Stallions players
Sportspeople from Aurora, Illinois